VFTS 243 (2MASS J05380840-6909190) is an O7V type main sequence star  that orbits a stellar mass black hole. The black hole is around nine times the mass of the Sun, with the blue star being 25 times the mass of the Sun making the star 200,000 times larger than the black hole. VFTS 243 is located in the Large Magellanic Cloud inside NGC 2070 (the Tarantula Nebula) around 160,000 light years from Earth. The binary has an orbital period of 10.4 days.

References 

O-type main-sequence stars
Stellar black holes
Dorado (constellation)
Binary stars
Stars in the Large Magellanic Cloud